The 1989 Daytona 500, the 31st running of the event, was held February 19, 1989, at Daytona International Speedway, in Daytona Beach, Florida. Darrell Waltrip won the race after Ken Schrader won the pole for the second time in a row.

Background

Daytona International Speedway is a race track in Daytona Beach, Florida that is one of six superspeedways to hold NASCAR races, the others being Michigan International Speedway, Auto Club Speedway, Indianapolis Motor Speedway, Pocono Raceway and Talladega Superspeedway. The track also features two other layouts that utilize portions of the primary high speed tri-oval, such as a  sports car course and a  motorcycle course. The track's  infield includes the  Lake Lloyd, which has hosted powerboat racing. The speedway is owned and operated by International Speedway Corporation.

The track was built by NASCAR founder Bill France, Sr. to host racing that was being held at the former Daytona Beach Road Course and opened with the first Daytona 500 in 1959. The speedway has been renovated three times, with the infield renovated in 2004, and the track repaved in 1978 and 2010.

The Daytona 500 is regarded as the most important and prestigious race on the NASCAR calendar. It is also the series' first race of the year; this phenomenon is virtually unique in sports, which tend to have championships or other major events at the end of the season rather than the start. Since 1995, U.S. television ratings for the Daytona 500 have been the highest for any auto race of the year, surpassing the traditional leader, the Indianapolis 500 which in turn greatly surpasses the Daytona 500 in in-track attendance and international viewing. The 2006 Daytona 500 attracted the sixth largest average live global TV audience of any sporting event that year with 20 million viewers.

Summary

In the last 53 laps without a pit stop and on a nearing empty tank, Darrell Waltrip took his #17 Chevrolet Monte Carlo to victory lane in the race. As his only chance at victory, Waltrip and his crew chief Jeff Hammond decided to use fuel strategy, being the only car not to pit in the closing laps.

The victory was Waltrip's first (and only) Daytona 500 race win in his 17th try, edging ahead of Hendrick Motorsports teammate Ken Schrader, who led the most laps, by 7.64 seconds. "I won the Daytona 500! I won the Daytona 500!," Waltrip shouted on the radio to his crew, adding "I can't believe I won it! Don't lie to me, this is Daytona, ain't it? I'm not dreamin', am I?" Still in disbelief, Waltrip asked television reporter Mike Joy in victory circle, "Wait, wait, this is the Daytona 500, isn't it? Don't tell me it isn't.", to which Joy replied "You bet it is." In celebration, Darrell performed his memorable 'Ickey Shuffle' dance with a helmet spike. The race is also remembered for Davey Allison flipping his car off of the dirt embankment separating the cars from Lake Lloyd. Waltrip's win gave Hendrick Motorsports their second Daytona 500 win. The first Daytona 500 win for Hendrick Motorsports was by Geoff Bodine three years prior.

With Dale Earnhardt and Geoff Bodine finishing third and fourth respectively, Chevrolet finished 1-2-3-4. Waltrip later won five additional races in the 1989 season, tying Rusty Wallace with the most wins of the season.

Finishing order
 17-Darrell Waltrip, Led 25 of 200 Laps
 25-Ken Schrader (polesitter), Led 114 Laps
 3-Dale Earnhardt, Led 3 Laps
 5-Geoffrey Bodine, Led 9 Laps
 55-Phil Parsons, Led 12 Laps
 66-Rick Mast*, Led 6 Laps
 7-Alan Kulwicki, Led 6 Laps
 4-Rick Wilson, Led 7 Laps
 11-Terry Labonte, Led 3 Laps
 23-Kyle Petty, Led 2 Laps
 94-Sterling Marlin, 1 Lap down
 33-Harry Gant, 1 Lap down
 45-Joe Ruttman, 1 Lap down
 16-Larry Pearson*, 1 Lap down
 75-Morgan Shepherd, 1 Lap down
 10-Ken Bouchard, 2 Laps down
 43-Richard Petty, 2 Laps down
 27-Rusty Wallace, 3 Laps down
 26-Ricky Rudd, 3 Laps down; Led 2 Laps
 71-Dave Marcis, 3 Laps down; Led 1 Lap
 30-Michael Waltrip, 3 Laps down; Led 1 Lap
 40-Ben Hess*, 4 Laps down
 88-Greg Sacks, 4 Laps do
 70-J.D. McDuffie, 7 Laps down
 28-Davey Allison, 7 Laps down
 69-Lee Raymond*, 11 Laps down
 84-Mike Alexander, 12 Laps down
 19-Ronnie Sanders, 16 Laps down
 15-Brett Bodine, 177 Laps Completed (Valve)
 83-Lake Speed, 50 Laps down
 73-Phil Barkdoll, 143 Laps (Accident); Led 2 Laps
 29-Dale Jarrett, 69 Laps down
 6-Mark Martin, 110 Laps (Accident)
 67-Mickey Gibbs*, 76 Laps (Engine Failure)
 9-Bill Elliott (Jody Ridley took over; see other notes), 72 Laps (Accident)
 90-Chad Little*, 72 Laps (Accident)
 89-Rodney Combs, 72 Laps (Accident)
 14-A. J. Foyt, 41 Laps (Shocks); Led 4 Laps
 8-Bobby Hillin Jr., 39 Laps (Accident)
 93-Charlie Baker*, 39 Laps (Accident)
 2-Ernie Irvan, 8 Laps (Engine)
 21-Neil Bonnett, 2 Laps (Oil line).

Failed to qualify
52-Jimmy Means, 57-Hut Stricklin*, 68-Derrike Cope, 42-Kyle Petty, 31-Jim Sauter, 95-Trevor Boys, 77-Connie Saylor, 34-Charlie Glotzbach, 74-Randy LaJoie*, 80-Jimmy Horton, 1-Doug Heveron, 41-Jim Bown*, 32-Philip Duffie*, 49-Tony Spanos*, 0-Delma Cowart*, 85-Bobby Gerhart*, 59-Mark Gibson*, and 39-Ricky Woodward*.

Other notes
On lap 3, Neil Bonnett's engine blew then caught fire. He stopped the Wood Brothers' Ford Thunderbird on the apron between turns 1 & 2 as smoke filled the car. He climbed out and fell to the ground as the race continued under the green flag. A lap later, NASCAR finally issued the yellow flag.
Eddie Bierschwale drove the #23 car, and when Neil Bonnett's engine blew on the third lap, Kyle Petty was put in the car en route to a 10th-place finish.
At the same time, Bill Elliott was relieved by Jody Ridley due to a wreck in practice before the Twin 125's.
On lap 23, the #28 of Davey Allison spun and hit the earthen bank that separated the backstretch grass from the shore of Lake Lloyd. The car slowly rolled once, but Allison finished the race (albeit minus the hood).
On lap 145, the Phil Barkdoll in his #73 got loose and spun out of 18th place coming off turn 2, spun through the grass, hit the earthen bank, and ended up on his side.

References
 Sports Illustrated February 27, 1989
 New York Times March 9, 1989

Daytona 500
Daytona 500
Daytona 500
NASCAR races at Daytona International Speedway